Linda McCartney Foods is a British food brand specializing in vegetarian and vegan food. Available in the UK, as well as Norway, Ireland, Austria, Australia, South Africa and New Zealand, the range includes chilled and frozen meat analogues in the form of burgers, sausages, sausage rolls, meatballs, stir-fry dishes and pastas.

The company was created in 1991 by musician, photographer and activist Linda McCartney, and has been described as one of the most successful mass-market celebrity brands.

History 
Linda McCartney Foods was established in April 1991, launching a range of frozen vegetarian products including golden nuggets, ploughman's pie (cheese pie), ploughman's pasties, lasagna, Italian style toppers, and beefless burgers. The recipes were based on dehydrated textured vegetable protein (TVP). Some of the sales proceeds were to go towards McCartney to further develop the range, and to fund her animal aid charity, Animal Line.

The packaging graphics were designed by Springett Associates, and featured Linda McCartney's portrait and signature, a black and white illustration by artist Jonathan Mercer, and the Vegetarian Society's seal of approval. The ready meals were manufactured by frozen food company Ross Young's, and were the first to not feature either the Ross or the Young's name. Springett did further work with Ross Young in 1995 to update the packaging with an emphasis on hand-written copy linked with the Linda McCartney persona. In October 1996, United Biscuits' McVitie's worked with Springett to update the woodcut design from country scenery to kitchen images. The campaign theme of "Delicious recipes created in Linda's kitchen," reflected a changed focus from mass production, to imply a personalised brand from McCartney's kitchen.

The Linda McCartney Foods brand was preceded by the bestseller success of McCartney's cookbook, Linda McCartney's Home Cooking, published in 1989. More than 40,000 copies were sold. The tour chef for the McCartney's band used recipes from the cookbook for the exclusively-vegetarian catered tour, labelled "rock's first veggie tour", in 1989.

Further products were added in circa 1991/1992 including Spaghetti Bolognese-style, Deep country pies, cauliflower and broccoli potato gratin and vegetable wedges. The Spaghetti Bolognese style was marketed as being the "...only meat analog version of the product" available on the market.

The range was introduced across Europe and America in 1992. The 12-product range had an annual turnover of 12 million pounds in 1992.

The products changed ingredients in circa August 1993, ceasing TVP and switching to wheat protein. This was marketed as providing a more meat-like taste than other meat analogue brands. However in 1995, it was noted that the sausages (available internationally) were manufactured from TVP seasoned with parsley.

The product range was expanded and improved in 1995, coinciding with the brand's television commercial and the opening of a dedicated factory in Fakenham. The new and updated options included beefless burgers, country-style Kievs, savoury burgers, crunchy garlic grills and vegetable cheese burgers.

In October 1996 as part of United Biscuits' McVitie's Prepared Foods, the range was improved to reduce fat and sodium and increase protein levels. At relaunch, a total of 14 products were offered, which included pepperoni-style main meal pizza, and modified existing offerings included: creamy garlic kievs, cannelloni, Linda's original stew and dumplings, chilli non carne with mozzarella potato wedges, and farmhouse-style pies.

Linda McCartney's Home Style Cooking

Linda McCartney's Home Style Cooking brand 
In December 1993, McCartney announced a line of vegetarian frozen entrees to be released in America under the brand name Linda McCartney's Foods from the Heart. The range was made under and agreement with Fairmont Foods of Minnesota (FFM). The range was launched in March 1994 as Linda McCartney's Home Style Cooking, and was the first American company with a completely meatless line of food products. Products included boil-in bag entrees: Fetticini Alfredo, Pasta Provencale, Pasta Primavera, Rigatone Marinara, Bavarian Goulash, Spaghetti Milano and Chili Non-Carne; and preplated dishes: Lasagna Roma and Burrito Grande.

In 1995, in addition to Pasta Primavera, Fettucini Alfredo, Lasagne Roma, Burrito Grande, other products were American Barbecue, Tex-Mex Tostada and Traditional Stew.

Controversies

Advertising contracts

Ross Young's 
Ross Young's had difficulty in advertising contracts for the range, as Butterfield Day Devito Hockney resigned their contract in 1991, and Lowe Howard-Spink resigned their subsequent contract after a six week period in August 1992. The advertising contract was won by GGT in November 1992, who then released their animated woodcut-print-inspired television campaign in April 1993. Linda McCartney featured in the brand's television commercials in October 1993. In May 1996, the brand commenced an advertising contract with agency Cowan Kemsley Taylor after a disagreement with GGT regarding advertising strategies.

Fairmont Foods 
In August 1993, Fairmont Foods entered a contract with advertising agency Zimmerman Group, but without a formal written agreement. Fairmont fired the agency on 28 February 1994. Fairmont filed a complaint in April 1994, and went to trial in August–September 1995 against Zimmerman, in a financial dispute. The claims, counterclaims and a third-party suit related to alleged overpayments, contract breaches and staff poaching.

Recalls

Pie recalls (1992) 
In October 1992, more than 700 pies were recalled as they contained meat. Ross Young's conducted an investigation into possible external tampering. While the Hull factory also produced Ross Young's steak and kidney pies, the products were never produced together. McCartney's continued endorsement of the range was given on the condition of intensive investigations and Ross Young's guarantees.

Burger recalls (1995–1996) 
In October 1995, the beefless burgers were recalled after they were found to contain more fat than advertised. This occurred after the Food Commission survey, ITV's current affairs programme (The Big Story) noted their 20 - 23 per cent fat content through independent laboratory testing. This contrasted with the packaging's claim of 11.2 per cent fat content. McCartney asked for the problem to be corrected and thousands of packs were recalled. Ross Young stated that there was no health risk, and a spokesperson stated that the products were marketed as "non-meat", not as a "low fat" food. The fat content variation was found to be due to the type of vegetarian mince used in manufacturing.

In 1996, Linda and Paul McCartney shipped one million soy veggie burgers to Sarajevo, to aid war recovery efforts in Bosnia. Linda provided the powdered "mercy meals", inspired by the fundraising 20-track "The Help Album", recorded by Paul and other celebrities. Three trucks were hired to transport 22 tonnes of dried burger mix.

After the burgers had been sent, they were found to have a high fat content, and were planned to be recalled.

Soya claims 
In 1999, the BBC Two's Newsnight programme alleged that Linda McCartney products contained genetically modified soya, directly contradicting a statement by the company.

International cycling sponsorship 
The Team Linda McCartney (also known as The Linda McCartney Pro Cycling Team) was an all-vegetarian cycling team, founded in 1998 and primarily sponsored by the food chain.

The brand was promoted by cyclist Benjamin Brooks until 2000, when his contract was not continued. The team competed in the 2001 Jacob's Creek Tour Down Under, and rider David McKenzie won the 2001 final stage of the Tour Down Under in Adelaide.

After three years, Linda McCartney Foods withdrew sponsorship from the team but allowed them to continue using branding while seeking a new sponsor. In early 2001, founder Julian Clark announced the disbandment of the Linda McCartney Team after the budget shortfall and debts of one million pounds, and the team parted ways with company OC Racing and Promotions. The International Cycling Union made criminal complaints of fraud against the team, and Clark faced deception charges in Maidstone Crown Court in February 2001.

Ownership
The brand became part of United Biscuits' McVitie's Prepared Foods division in March 1996.

The company was sold in December 1999 to H.J. Heinz Co., who planned to sell the vegetarian food products worldwide. It was acquired as part of purchasing United Biscuits' frozen and chilled foods division.

It was sold again in 2006 to the Hain Celestial Group. The McCartney family remains involved in its development.

See also
 List of meat substitutes
List of vegetarian and vegan companies

References

External links

1991 establishments in the United Kingdom
Food brands of the United Kingdom
Linda McCartney
Vegetarian companies and establishments of the United Kingdom
Vegan cuisine
Food and drink companies established in 1991
Meat substitutes
Imitation foods